Narbolia is a comune (municipality) in the Province of Oristano in the Italian region Sardinia, located about  northwest of Cagliari and about  north of Oristano.
This comune is famous in Sardinia for the "Zippole"; a typical food for carnival in Italian "carnevale".

Narbolia borders the following municipalities: Cuglieri, Riola Sardo, San Vero Milis, Seneghe, Milis, Putzu Idu.

Demographic evolution

References

Cities and towns in Sardinia